The old main synagogue is a religious edifice in Segovia, Spain. Dating to  the 14th century, it was converted into a convent of the nuns of Order of Saint Clare. The building was almost completely destroyed in a fire in 1899 and has been reconstructed since.

History 

The construction of the old main synagogue took place around mid-14th century. Beginning in the 15th century, it was confiscated by the authorities and converted into a church in 1419, dedicated to Corpus Christi. In 1421, the bishop of Segovia handed the building and premises over to the Monastery of Santa María de Párraces. The monastery in turn sold it to two brothers, Manuel and Antonio del Sello, who transformed it into a convent for the Sisters of Penitence. The former synagogue still forms part of that convent.

Architecture 
The entrance to the synagogue is not directly from the street, but through a courtyard. The shape of the synagogue was rectangular, divided into three naves by two large arcades in the Moorish style. The pillars supporting these arches are octagonal in shape and have large capitals featuring vegetal decoration. Above each of the two arcades ran a smaller arcade connecting the two big arches from the ground with the top of the central nave. In 1899 a fire completely destroyed the building. Its present appearance is a result of restoration work that took place starting in 1902 and the last one in 2004, when the original plasterwork of the capitals was restored. The reconstruction was possible since small fragments of the original capitals were discovered, which made the reproduction possible. Opposite the entrance hangs a painting by Vicente Cutanda called Miracle in the synagogue (Milagro en la sinagoga), painted in 1902.

Sources
 Bonifacio Bartolomé Herrero. Jewry guide of Segovia. Caja Segovia. 
 Felipe Torroba, Bernaldo de Quirós. The Spanish Jews. Libros Certeza. Zaragoza.

External links 

 Jewish Encyclopedia | Synagogue Converted into a Church

Buildings and structures in Segovia
Buildings converted to Catholic church buildings
14th-century synagogues
Synagogues in Spain
Conversion of non-Christian religious buildings and structures into churches
Sephardi synagogues